Royal Academy of Letters may refer to:
 Royal Swedish Academy of Letters, History and Antiquities
 Royal Danish Academy of Sciences and Letters